The First Government of the Republic of Croatia (from the date of formation until 25 July 1990 it was legally referred to as the 14th Executive Council of the Socialist Republic of Croatia) was the Croatian Government announced on 30 May 1990 after the first multi-party elections ended 45 years of Communist Party rule, but while Croatia still remained a federal unit within SFR Yugoslavia. The prime minister (formally still President of the Executive Council of SR Croatia) was Stjepan Mesić of the Croatian Democratic Union.  The cabinet was reformed on 24 August 1990 when Stjepan Mesić left Zagreb to assume the Croatian seat at the Yugoslav collective presidency following armed insurrection by ethnic Serbs.

Party breakdown 
Party breakdown of cabinet ministers (24 August 1990):
Note: Government secretary attended cabinet meeting and was non-partisan

List of ministers and portfolios
Some periods in the table end after the cabinet's reorganization, when the minister listed continued in the post in the subsequent cabinet of Josip Manolić.

References

External links
Official website of the Croatian Government

Mesic, Stjepan
1990 establishments in Croatia
1990 disestablishments in Croatia
Cabinets established in 1990
Cabinets disestablished in 1990